Long Beach Boulevard station is a elevated light rail station on the C Line of the Los Angeles Metro Rail system. It is located in the median of Interstate 105 (Century Freeway), above Long Beach Boulevard, after which the station is named, in the city of Lynwood, California.

The station is not named for the city of Long Beach, which is located several miles south of this station, and is served by A Line.

The original name for the station was Long Beach Blvd/I-105, but was later changed to Long Beach Boulevard.

History 

Prior to the establishment of service on Metro Green Line, the location served as Lynwood depot, a station on the Pacific Electric's Santa Ana Line serving the West Santa Ana Branch.  At some point after service was discontinued, the small mission revival station building was relocated to Lynwood Park to make way for the Century Freeway, where it still stands to this day.  The 1917 depot, one of only several in the area which survived the devastating 1933 Long Beach earthquake, has been registered as a historic American building by the Historic American Buildings Survey. It is listed on the National Register of Historic Places.

Service

Station layout

Hours and frequency

Connections 
, the following connections are available:
 Los Angeles Metro Bus: , 
 Lynwood Breeze: A

References 

C Line (Los Angeles Metro) stations
Railway stations in the United States opened in 1995
Lynwood, California
1995 establishments in California